Poecilus festivus is a species of ground beetle belonging to the family Carabidae.

References 

Pterostichinae
Beetles described in 1868